Neridronic acid (INN; the anion is called neridronate) is a bisphosphonate. In Italy it is used to treat Osteogenesis imperfecta and Paget's disease of bone.

A 2013 clinical trial suggests CRPS Type I (Complex regional pain syndrome) responds to treatment with intravenous neridronate.

References 

Bisphosphonates